Eugene J. P. O'Brien (12 January 1897 – 29 September 1980) was an Irish politician. He was elected to Dáil Éireann as a Cumann na nGaedheal Teachta Dála (TD) for the Leix–Offaly constituency at the 1932 general election. He lost his seat at the 1933 general election.

References

1897 births
1980 deaths
Cumann na nGaedheal TDs
Members of the 7th Dáil
Politicians from County Offaly